James Foye III, professionally known as KEYZBABY, is an American record producer, songwriter, audio engineer and recording engineer from Buffalo, New York. He is one half of The Upperclassmen, a production team with Ayo the Producer. KEYZBABY has worked with artists such as Chris Brown, Bryson Tiller, K Michelle, Wiz Khalifa, Diddy and Rick Ross.

Discography

References

Living people
African-American record producers
Record producers from New York (state)
Songwriters from New York (state)
Year of birth missing (living people)
21st-century African-American people